AKN may refer to:

 Akn (Armenian: Ակն), a town in Eastern Anatolia, Turkey
 King Salmon Airport, Bristol Bay Borough, Alaska, US, IATA code
 AKN Eisenbahn, rail operator in Hamburg and Schleswig-Holstein
 AKN format (.akn), an XML format for government documents
 Acne keloidalis nuchae, a skin condition